Thomas A. Curran (May 29, 1879 – January 24, 1941), was an Australian-born American actor on the stage and in motion pictures. Between 1915 and 1941 he appeared in 60 films, the last of which was Citizen Kane, in which he played the uncredited role of Theodore Roosevelt in the "News on the March" newsreel sequence.

Biography
Thomas A. Curran was born on May 29, 1879, in Sydney, Australia. He studied acting in the United States, where he made his stage debut in 1897. After returning to Australia for a few years, he returned to the U.S. in 1912 or 1913 and worked in vaudeville and repertory theatre. He acted in the original productions of Excuse Me written by Rupert Hughes (later adapted twice for the screen) and Oh! Oh! Delphine.

Curran was signed to a three-year contract by the Thanhouser Company in 1915 and made 22 films, including The World and the Woman with Jeanne Eagels and Inspiration, the first non-pornographic American film to show full female nudity. In his later years he moved to California and made his living playing bit parts and small roles in studio films. His last film appearance was as Teddy Roosevelt in the "News on the March" sequence in Citizen Kane. The film had not yet been released when Curran, aged 61, died in Hollywood January 24, 1941.

Filmography

References

External links

1879 births
1941 deaths
American male film actors
American male stage actors
American male silent film actors
20th-century American male actors
Articles containing video clips
Australian emigrants to the United States